
The Waddell ministry was the 31st ministry of the New South Wales Government, and was led by the 15th Premier, Thomas Waddell. The title of Premier was widely used to refer to the Leader of Government, but was not a formal position in the government until 1920. Instead the Premier was appointed to another portfolio, usually Colonial Secretary, however in this case Waddell chose to retain his previous portfolio of Colonial Treasurer.

Waddell was elected to the New South Wales Legislative Assembly in 1887 as member for Bourke, serving in the See ministry, prior to assuming leadership of the Progressive Party following the retirement of Sir John See, KCMG due to ill health. The Governor, Sir Harry Rawson, was not prepared to appoint Paddy Crick as Premier, due to his excessive drinking in cabinet meetings, nor Bernhard Wise, who he regarded as unreliable. Waddell was appointed instead and both Crick and Wise declined to serve in his ministry. The three vacancies were filled by the appointment of barrister James Gannon from outside of parliament to be Attorney General and the promotion of ministers without portfolio John Fegan and Walter Bennett.

Under the constitution, ministers in the Legislative Assembly vacated their seats on appointment and would have to regain the seat at a by-election. On this occasion there were only two new ministers, Walter Bennett and John Fegan. They had been ministers without portfolio in the See ministry however the absence of a portfolio meant they were not paid in addition to their allowance as a member of parliament. Their appointment to a portfolio in this ministry meant they had been appointed to an "office of profit" and their seats were vacated on acceptance. No by-elections were held however as parliament was dissolved on 16 July 1904 for the general election.

The ministry covers the period from 14 June 1904 until 29 August 1904. Waddell's Progressive Party was defeated at the 1904 state election, however remained in office until parliament sat and provided supply for the incoming government. Waddell was succeeded by Joseph Carruthers and his Liberal Reform Party.

Composition of ministry
The composition of the ministry was announced by Premier Waddell on 15 June 1904 and covers the period up to 29 August 1904.

Ministers were members of the Legislative Assembly unless otherwise noted.

See also

References

 

New South Wales ministries
1904 disestablishments in Australia
1904 establishments in Australia